Hajjiabad (also Romanized as Ḩājjīābād) is a village in Mizdej-e Olya Rural District, in the Central District of Farsan County, Chaharmahal and Bakhtiari Province, Iran. At the 2006 census, its population was 82, in 13 families. The village is populated by Lurs.

References 

Populated places in Farsan County
Luri settlements in Chaharmahal and Bakhtiari Province